The Devil and Sherlock Holmes: Tales of Murder, Madness, and Obsession (2010) is a collection of 12 essays by American journalist David Grann.

Essays
The essays were previously published between 2000 and 2009 in The New Yorker, The New York Times Magazine, The New Republic and The Atlantic, and have been "updated and revised". The stories are about real-life mysteries, a "mosaic of ambition, deception, passion, and folly."

Anthologies
Four of the stories have been filmed or optioned, and five of the stories have been collected in other "best" anthology volumes. It is Grann's second book, after The Lost City of Z (2009) published the previous year, and his first collected anthology of essays.

Critical response
In The New York Times, Sam Roberts called the book "riveting." Writing in Entertainment Weekly, critic Keith Staskiewicz gave the collection a grade of A: "This collection of David Grann's nonfiction, much of it from The New Yorker, is by turns horrifying, hilarious, and outlandish... These straightforward tales grip you as unrelentingly as the suckered appendages of the giant squid Grann attempts to track down in 'The Squid Hunter.' You might feel that some of the pieces skirt credibility, but remember, as Holmes himself once said, Life is infinitely stranger than anything which the mind of man could invent.'"

Contents

Editions
Grann, David. The Devil and Sherlock Holmes: Tales of Murder, Madness, and Obsession. March 9, 2010. Doubleday.  (hardcover, first edition).

Notes

External links
"Deception And 'The Devil And Sherlock Holmes'", NPR, Talk of the Nation, March 9, 2010.
"David Grann on murder, madness and writing for The New Yorker", interview in Nieman Storyboard'', April 5, 2010.

2010 non-fiction books
Non-fiction crime books
Essay collections
Doubleday (publisher) books